39 Aurigae is a single star in the constellation of Auriga. The designation is from the star catalogue of English astronomer John Flamsteed, first published in 1712. The star is just barely visible to the naked eye, having an apparent visual magnitude of 5.90. Based upon an annual parallax shift of 20.11 mas as seen from Earth, it is located 112 light years away. 5 Andromedae is moving further from the Sun with a radial velocity of +34 km/s. It has a relatively high proper motion, advancing across the celestial sphere at the rate of 0.151 arc seconds per year.

This is an F-type main-sequence star with a stellar classification of F1 V. It is an estimated 603 million years old with a relatively high rate of spin, showing a projected rotational velocity of around 88 km/s. The star has 1.45 times the mass of the Sun and it is radiating 9.36 times the Sun's luminosity from its photosphere at an effective temperature of around 7,161 K.

References

F-type main-sequence stars
High-proper-motion stars
Auriga (constellation)
Durchmusterung objects
Aurigae, 39
041074
028823
2132